12305 Fifth Helena Dr. is a home in Brentwood, Los Angeles, California. The house is most famous as the final residence of Marilyn Monroe and the location of her death on August 4, 1962.

Location
The property is located at 12305 Fifth Helena Drive in the Brentwood neighborhood of Los Angeles, California.

Overview
The one-story, Hacienda-style home sits on 2,900 square feet at the end of a quiet cul-de-sac off Carmelina Ave. Built in 1929, the L-shaped property now consists of four bedrooms (only two existed when Monroe lived there) and three bathrooms. In the backyard, a free-form pool is adjacent to a citrus grove and guest house. Its "Cursum Perficio" tiles on the front doorstep translate to "I have completed my journey." It is unknown whether Monroe or a successive owner installed the tiles.

Ownership
In February 1962, Monroe purchased the property for $77,500. She reportedly paid for half of the home in cash and took out a mortgage for the second half. In the early morning of August 5, 1962, six months after purchasing the home, Monroe was found dead of a barbiturate overdose in her bedroom.

In 2017, the house was put for sale for $6.9 million and eventually sold for $7.25 million.

References

Houses in Los Angeles
Houses completed in 1929
Brentwood, Los Angeles
Marilyn Monroe